Zokhid Kenjaev (born 30 March 1992) is an Uzbekistani table tennis player. He competed at the 2016 Summer Olympics in the men's singles event, in which he was eliminated in the second round by Liam Pitchford.

References

1992 births
Living people
Uzbekistani male table tennis players
Olympic table tennis players of Uzbekistan
Table tennis players at the 2016 Summer Olympics
21st-century Uzbekistani people